Leonidas H. Inscho (1840–1907) was an American soldier and member of the 12th Ohio Infantry  who fought in the American Civil War and was awarded the Medal of Honor for capturing a Confederate captain and some of his men, despite an injury to his left hand.

Inscho enlisted in 1861, and was wounded twice, once in 1862, and once in 1863.

He was awarded the Medal of Honor on January 31, 1894.

References

1840 births
1907 deaths
Union Army soldiers
United States Army Medal of Honor recipients
American Civil War recipients of the Medal of Honor